Pedro Camejo, also known as Negro Primero ("The First Black"), was a Venezuelan soldier that fought with the Royal Army and later with the Independence Army during the Venezuelan War of Independence, reaching the rank of lieutenant. The nickname Negro Primero was inspired by his bravery and skill in handling spears, and because he was always in the first line of attack on the battlefield. It is also attributed to his having been the only black officer in the army of Simón Bolívar.

Biography 

Pedro Camejo was born a slave, property of a Spanish royalist Vincente Alonzo on March 30, 1790, in San Juan de Payara. He gained his freedom in 1816 after enlisting in the military to fight in the war for independence. Camejo was one of the 150 lancers who participated in the Battle of Las Queseras del Medio, later receiving the Order of Liberators of Venezuela for his participation. In the Battle of Carabobo, he fought with one of the cavalry regiments of the first division commanded by José Antonio Páez. Eduardo Blanco, in his book Venezuela Heroica, describes the moment when Camejo presented himself before General Páez with an unfailing voice said to him: "My general, I come to tell you goodbye, because I am dead".

References

External links 
  
 

1790 births
1821 deaths
People from Apure
People of the Venezuelan War of Independence
Venezuelan soldiers
History of Venezuela
Venezuelan revolutionaries
Burials at the National Pantheon of Venezuela